William Ryan may refer to:

William D. Ryan (1861–1949), American labor unionist
William Fitts Ryan (1922–1972), congressman from New York
William H. Ryan (1860–1939), U.S. Representative from New York and Abbeyland
William H. Ryan Jr., former Delaware County District Attorney and acting Pennsylvania Attorney General
William Ryan (53rd Congress) (1840–1925), represented New York's 16th District in the Fifty-third United States Congress
William Ryan (Irish politician) (1921–1994), Irish Fianna Fáil politician, senator 1961–1989
William Ryan (film director), director of Reach the Rock and Flubber
William Ryan (geologist), proponent of the Black Sea deluge theory
William Ryan (psychologist) (c. 1924–2002), author of the 1971 book Blaming the Victim
William Ryan (sailor) (born 1988), Australian sailor
William Ryan (Canadian politician) (1887–1938), Canadian Member of Parliament
William Ryan (footballer), English professional footballer who played as a goalkeeper
William Patrick Ryan (1867–1942), Irish author and journalist
William F. Ryan (1907–1954), American checkers player
William A. Ryan (1919–2001), politician from Michigan
William B. Ryan (1908-1975), American politician, lawyer, and judge
Will Ryan (William F. Ryan, 1949–2021), American voice actor and singer
Will Ryan (basketball) (born 1978), American basketball coach

See also
Willie Ryan (disambiguation)
Bill Ryan (disambiguation)
Liam Ryan (disambiguation)